Rhabdobacter roseus  is a Gram-negative, aerobic, non-spore-forming and non-motile bacterium from the genus Rhabdobacter which has been isolated from soil.

References

External links
Type strain of Rhabdobacter roseus at BacDive -  the Bacterial Diversity Metadatabase

Cytophagia
Bacteria described in 2016